The Little Belt Bridge, also known as the Old Little Belt Bridge, is a truss bridge over the Little Belt strait in Denmark. It spans from Snoghøj on the Jutland side to Middelfart on Funen.

The bridge is owned by the state and Banedanmark, the Danish railway authority, is responsible for its maintenance.  It was the first bridge constructed over the strait, beginning the connection of the three main parts of Denmark by road and rail, which was completed with the Great Belt Bridge in June 1998. Previously, only ferries and other boats had transported people over the belts.

Construction 
The Little Belt Bridge was built by Monberg & Thorsen. Construction of the bridge began in 1929 and it was opened for traffic on 14 May 1935.  It is 1,178 metres long, 20.5 metres wide and 33 metres high, with a main span of 220 metres.  On the bridge there are two railway tracks, two narrow lanes for cars to cross as well as a sidewalk for pedestrians. No mass machinery was used in the construction of the bridge at the time.  The bases of the piles were lowered into the sea from boats according to precise calculations, and molds both for the piles and each end of the bridge were first constructed of wood and later manually filled with cement from buckets.

Conversion to railway use
When the new Little Belt Bridge came into use in 1970, the old bridge lost its function as the main traffic line for cars between Funen and Jutland; however, it is still used as the only railway bridge between Jutland and Funen and thus the only railway line connecting Jutland with Zealand as well, as well as to carry traffic between Fredericia and Middelfart and their neighbouring villages.

Maintenance 

The bridge requires constant maintenance.  During the first decades after its construction, a group of workers would begin painting the entire steel structure from one end, proceed to the other and begin all over again once that was finished.

Five to thirteen people work on the bridge at all times.

All road traffic was closed major parts of 2018 and 2019 due to renovation work. Train traffic went most of the time as it is the only connection over Little Belt.

Tours 
In 2015, guided 'bridgewalking' tours on top of the framework were introduced at the Little Belt Bridge. A standard tour will take two hours and is offered among high security measures.

See also 
New Little Belt Bridge

References

External links 

The Old Little Belt Bridge – Highways-Denmark.com
Picture gallery
Pictures of the bridge
Picture of and information about the bridge

Bridges in Denmark
Truss bridges in Denmark
Cantilever bridges
Road bridges in Denmark
Railway bridges in Denmark
Road-rail bridges
Bridges completed in 1935
1935 establishments in Denmark
Connections across the Baltic Sea
Buildings and structures in Fredericia Municipality
Buildings and structures in Middelfart Municipality